Taroomball is a rural locality in the Livingstone Shire, Queensland, Australia.

Geography
Ross Creek rises in the south of the locality and flows to the north before exiting.

References 

Shire of Livingstone
Localities in Queensland